The 2016 Mobil 1 SportsCar Grand Prix was a professional sports car racing event held at Canadian Tire Motorsport Park near Bowmanville, Ontario on July 7, 8, 9 and 10, 2016.  The race was the seventh round of the 2016 WeatherTech SportsCar Championship and the event marked the 31st IMSA sanctioned sports car race held at the facility.

Race background
For 2016, the WeatherTech Championship race featured all four classes,  Prototype (P),  Prototype Challenge (PC), GT Le Mans (GTLM) and the GT Daytona (GTD) for the first time since the  2013 edition of the Grand Prix.
The weekend also included races for the Continental Tire SportsCar Challenge, Mazda Prototype Lites, the Global MX-5 Cup and the Nissan Micra Cup.

Report

Race summary
The race was won overall by Eric Curran and Dane Cameron, driving a Chevrolet Corvette DP for Action Express Racing. They finished ahead of the Action Express Racing sister car of João Barbosa and Christian Fittipaldi, while the podium was completed by  Ricky and Jordan Taylor of Wayne Taylor Racing. In sixth place overall, CORE Autosport won the Prototype Challenge class with drivers Jon Bennett and Colin Braun, while the GT Le Mans honors were taken by Ford Chip Ganassi Racing drivers Ryan Briscoe and Richard Westbrook in the Ford GT in fourteenth place overall. The GT Daytona class was won by Bret Curtis and Jens Klingmann in the Turner Motorsport BMW M6 GT3.

Race results

Media

Television
The race was broadcast live by Fox Sports on Fox Sports 1 in the United States and on Fox Sports Racing in Canada, Puerto Rico and the Caribbean. The event was televised internationally by FOX Sports Latin America, Motors TV in Europe, and Fox Sports Asia.

Radio
The race was broadcast by IMSA Radio with announcers John Hindhaugh and Jeremy Shaw calling the race on IMSA.tv and radiolemans.com,  and simulcast on Sirius channel 106 satellite radio and on 90.7 FM at the track.

Support race results

References

External links
 Mobil 1 SportsCar Grand Prix official website
 IMSA.com Canadian Tire Motorsport Park event page
 
 IMSA Radio 2016 SportsCar Grand Prix Race Broadcast
 

2016 in Canadian motorsport
2016 WeatherTech SportsCar Championship season
SportsCar Grand Prix
Grand Prix of Mosport